Pablo Javier Moreira Virgini (born November 8, 1970 in Quilmes) is a field hockey goalkeeper from Argentina, who made his debut for the national squad in 1991 at the Pan American Games in Cuba. He played for Club Atlético Ducilo in Buenos Aires. Moreira competed for his native country at the 1992 Summer Olympics in Barcelona (11th place), the 2000 Summer Olympics in Sydney (8th place) and at the 2004 Summer Olympics in Athens (11th place).

References
sports-reference

External links
 

1970 births
Living people
Argentine male field hockey players
Male field hockey goalkeepers
Olympic field hockey players of Argentina
Field hockey players at the 1992 Summer Olympics
Field hockey players at the 1996 Summer Olympics
Field hockey players at the 2000 Summer Olympics
Field hockey players at the 2004 Summer Olympics
2002 Men's Hockey World Cup players
People from Quilmes
Pan American Games gold medalists for Argentina
Pan American Games medalists in field hockey
Field hockey players at the 1991 Pan American Games
Medalists at the 1991 Pan American Games
Medalists at the 1995 Pan American Games
Medalists at the 2003 Pan American Games
Sportspeople from Buenos Aires Province
20th-century Argentine people
21st-century Argentine people